Place name changes in Armenia have been undertaken, periodically, from the 20th century, during the existence of the Armenian SSR of the Soviet Union, up to the present-day independent Republic of Armenia. Whereas most altered place names during the Soviet period were of Turkic origin, following the dissolution of the Soviet Union in 1991 it has expanded to include non-Turkic place names as well.

An analysis by the political scientist Husik Ghulyan covering place name changes in Armenia in the period from 2006 to 2018 showed that most altered place names were of Turkic, Russian and Yezidi/Kurdish origins. Those of Turkic origins are subject to change due to the prevalent anti-Turkish nationalist sentiments grounded in the country as a result of the Armenian Genocide and related matters (i.e. Denial of the Armenian Genocide, etc.) and the Nagorno-Karabakh conflict with the Republic of Azerbaijan. Simultaneously, nationalist claims of autochthony has resulted in place names related to Russian-speakers (Molokans) and Kurdish-speakers (Yezidis) being labeled as "foreign" and "inharmonious" and are therefore also replaced by Armenian names or other names that are viewed as "native" and "harmonious".

Context and background
Although the concept of nationalism was considered an enemy by the Soviet authorities for some time after the inception of the Soviet Union, the Soviet authorities were ultimately compelled to create a new nationalities policy as they were confronted with the problem of nationalism. Therefore, the political scientist Husik Ghulyan notes (citing the Russologist T.D. Martin), that Soviet authorities in response to rising nationalist sentiments systematically promoted "the national consciousness of its ethnic minorities and establishing for them many of the characteristic institutional forms of the nation-state". The sociologist Rogers Brubaker narrates: "no other state has gone so far in sponsoring, codifying, institutionalizing, even (in some cases) inventing nationhood and nationality on the sub-state level’ and establishing nationhood and nationality as fundamental social categories".

Name place changes which occurred in the Armenian SSR of the Soviet Union after the 1950s reflected the growing trend of Armenian nationalism, in addition to both a national and a nationalist revival. The Soviet authorities tolerated renaming practises which were based on nationalism and they "thus contributed greatly to the formation of the Armenian national identity". During the Soviet period in Armenia, most altered place names had been of Turkic origin. According to the historian Arsène Saparov, the experience of the Armenian genocide was the main source for Armenian nationalism after the 1950s which in turn (amongst others issues) determined place-naming practises.

By the late Soviet period, when the spread of national themes had become widespread in numerous constituent Soviet republics, the idea of autochthonism of only Armenians (as Ghulyan explains: "implying their indigeneity and primordialism and the nationalism supported by it) was often discussed within the Armenian SSR. The same habit could be seen in many other Soviet republics were histories were once again re-written. The historian Ronald Grigor Suny states that it was during the late Soviet period that "the story of the republic of Armenia was told as a story of ethnic Armenians, with the Azerbaijanis and Kurds largely left out, just as the histories of neighbouring republics were re-produced as narratives of the titular nationalities".

Most of the population of present-day Armenia, which includes the bulk of its ethnic Armenian majority, as well as the small minorities of Russians/Molokans and Yezidis/Kurds, are descended from migrants from various regions of the Ottoman, Iranian and Russian empires, and only a small percentage of Armenians living in Armenia have an indigenous origin within the borders of present-day Armenia. Saparov explains that in 1831 indigenous Armenians only amounted for 15.3% of all Armenians inhabiting the newly formed Armenian Oblast of the Russian Empire. Although the academic consensus views the proto-Armenians as probable migrants to the Armenian Highlands, in the 1980s in Soviet Armenia, a revisionist school emerged that viewed the Armenians as aboriginals who had lived in the Armenian Highlands continuously since the 4th millennium BC; according to this view, ancient Urartu was also proclaimed as an Armenian state. The view of Armenians being autochthons of the area which includes the territory of modern-day Armenia, is viewed by Ghulyan as an important matters for the "nationalist discourse in Armenia which also appears as the major basis for recent renaming practises". Ghulyan adds: "Leaving aside the question whether Armenians are autochthonous people in the region or the fact that Armenians compared with other major ethnic groups inhabiting the territory of Armenia (such as Kurds/Yezidis and Russians/Molokans) are relatively earlier inhabitants of the region, in any case the nationalist discourse on autochthony can be considered the major frame for recent renaming practices".

In 1999, eight years after the dissolution of the Soviet Union, the independent Republic of Armenia passed the Law on Geographical Names, the main legal framework in relation to the concept of geographical names in the country. The law, which has been amended on several occasions since then, allows the renaming of places so their historical place names can be restored, in order to eliminate the use of "foreign", "inharmonious" or repetitive names, regulate the use of geographical names and put geographical names in alphabetical order.

Place name changes in 2006–2018
Ghulyan conducted an analysis on the decisions of the Armenian government from 2006 to 2018 on the approval and registration of the names of geographical objects. Ghulyan extracted and analyzed 27,897 geographical names in total, comprising the total number of "physical-geographical objects that appear in the respective governmental decisions of the period between 2006 and 2018". Ghulyan categorized the geographical names he analyzed into four major categories in terms of their association and signification rather than etymology. The four toponym categories were: Armenian, Turkic, Russian and Kurdish/Yezidi. This categorization congruents with the most recent ethnic composition and distribution of the four major ethnic groups that were found in Armenia, namely Armenians, Azerbaijanis, Russians/Molokans and Yezidis/Kurds. Ghulyan notes that his results may not be 100% accurate as there were cases where the "signification, association and symbolic role, especially the perception of the names of the objects, may have various interpretations". As Ghulyan's study was not etymological, there were instances where, for example, it was confusing to "determine and thus codify a name as Kurdish or Turkic".

Ghulyan's results showed that in 2006–2018, the names of 8910 geographical objects were changed in Armenia, which accounts for 31,9% of the 27,897 geographical names in total which were extracted and analyzed. The vast majority of the 27,897 names were of Armenian origin, signification and association (22,169) followed by Turkic (7742), Russian (526) and Kurdish (298). Most renamings conducted within this time frame were to fully or partially replace those names of Turkic, Russian and Kurdish associations.

Turkic place names were quite prevalent in areas that were mostly populated by Turkic peoples (in particular Azerbaijanis, according to Ghulyan) such as those in Gegharkunik, Kotayk, and Vayots Dzor, in addition to some districts in Syunik and Ararat. Although the names of Turkic association were proportionally most prevalent in aforementioned areas, names of Turkic association could be found all over Armenia, including the more remote and inaccessible areas in the northeast and south.

Russian place names were especially numerous in the north and southeast of Lori and in the northeastern and northwestern part of the Gegharkunik region according to Ghulyan. The distribution of Yezidi/Kurdish toponyms mostly follows the prevalence of Yezidi communities within Armenia; they are "relatively numerous" in the topoynymy of the Aragatsotn region.

Assessment
During the Soviet period most altered place names had been of Turkic origin; following Armenia's independence, this trend has shifted and expanded to include non-Turkic place names as well.

According to Ghulyan, toponyms which had a Turkic association were nearly all replaced with names which refer to Armenians, whereas toponyms which contained "references to other ethnic or religious groups (Russians, Georgians, Kurds and others) were generally left intact, or if changed, the reference to them was retained". Ghulyan adds: "Thus, an attempt was made to replace Turkic names and also to eliminate as much as possible any reference to Turkic people. Moreover, place names that were named Koroglu, after the main hero of the oral traditions of the Turkic peoples, were completely replaced by Armenian names. In the same way, nearly all references to Islam were replaced with completely different Armenian names or names mirroring their Christian version".

Ghulyan narrates:

See also 

 Place name changes in Turkey

References

Sources
 
 

Armenian Soviet Socialist Republic
Armenian nationalism
Anti-Azerbaijanism in Armenia
Names of places by country
Geographical renaming
Society of Armenia
Place name etymologies
Politics of the Soviet Union
Politics of Armenia